We (Ԝ ԝ; italics: Ԝ ԝ) is a letter of the Cyrillic script. In all of its forms it looks exactly like the Latin letter W (W w W w).

We is used in the Cyrillic orthography of the Kurdish language, in (some versions of the orthography of) the Yaghnobi language and in the Tundra Yukaghir language.

Usage
The pronunciations shown in the table are the primary ones for each language; for details consult the articles on the languages. Lowercase We is similar to some forms of Cyrillic Omega in appearance.

Computing codes

See also
Cyrillic characters in Unicode
Ѡ, a similar-looking letter in archaic Cyrillic texts for /o/
W w : Latin letter W
Ў ў : Cyrillic letter Ў, another letter romanized as "W"

References